= List of ambassadors of Turkey to Brunei =

The list of ambassadors of Turkey to Brunei provides a chronological record of individuals who have served as the diplomatic representatives of the Republic of Turkey to Brunei Darussalam.

== List of ambassadors ==
Ambassador	Term start	Term end	Ref.
Fikret Oğuz Ateş	15 October 2013	6 November 2016	
Mehmet Suat Akgün	12 November 2016	28 February 2021	
Hamit Ersoy	15 March 2021	Present	
